Voltaic Labour Party (in French: Parti Travailliste Voltaïque), was a centre-left political party in Upper Volta. PTV contested the 1970 elections, without any significant result.

PTV functioned as the political branch of the Voltaic Organization of Free Trade Unions (OVSL).

Source: Englebert, Pierre. La Revolution Burkinabè. Paris: L'Harmattan, 1986.

Defunct political parties in Burkina Faso